Red Caps is an Italian-Finnish animated television series produced by Cartoon-One in 2011. The series focuses on the adventures of a group of elves, and it is characterized by educational and moral purposes which gained to it the support of a number of institutions, including UNICEF and the Finnish Ministry of Environment.

A film based on the series, titled Santa's Magic Crystal, was distributed in 2011 in 3D. In the English-language version, Joe Carey played Santa Claus, Kyle E. Christensen as Yotan and David Dreisen as Grouch.

Plot
It has become impossible for Santa Claus to personally answer all the children's cries for help from all over the world. So Santa has gathered all his best tomties around him and founded the RED CAPS Task Force, versus Santa's evil brother Basil with his assistants Grouch and robotics.

References

2010s animated television series
Finnish children's animated fantasy television series
Italian children's animated fantasy television series